Dave is a district of the city of Namur, Wallonia, Belgium.

Sub-municipalities of Namur (city)
Former municipalities of Namur (province)